In Greek mythology, Salmoneus (Ancient Greek: Σαλμωνεύς) was 'the wicked' eponymous king and founder of Salmone in Pisatis.

Family 
Salmoneus was formerly a Thessalian prince as son of King Aeolus of Aeolia. His mother was identified as (1) Enarete, daughter of Deimachus, or (2) Iphis, daughter of Peneus, or (3) Laodice, daughter of Aloeus. Salmoneus was the brother of Athamas, Sisyphus, Cretheus, Perieres, Deioneus, Magnes, Calyce, Canace, Alcyone, Pisidice and Perimede.

Salmoneus's first wife was Alcidice by whom he became the father of Tyro, while his second wife was Sidero.

Mythology
Emigrating from Aeolis with a number of Aeolians, Salmoneus founded a city in Eleia (Elis) on the banks of the river Alpheius and called it Salmonia after his own name. He then married Alcidice, the daughter of Aleus but when she died, the king took for a second wife Sidero who treated his beautiful daughter Tyro unkindly.

Salmoneus and his brother Sisyphus hated each other. Sisyphus found out from an oracle that if he married Tyro, she would bear him children who would kill Salmoneus. At first, Tyro submitted to Sisyphus, married him, and bore him a son. When Tyro found out what the child would do to Salmoneus, she killed the boy. It was soon after this that Tyro lay with Poseidon and bore him Pelias and Neleus.

Salmoneus, being an overbearing man and impious, came to be hated by his subjects for he ordered them to worship him under the name of Zeus. He built a bridge of brass, over which he drove at full speed in his chariot to imitate thunder, the effect being heightened by dried skins and cauldrons trailing behind while torches were thrown into the air to represent lightning. For this sin of hubris, Zeus eventually struck him down with his thunderbolt and destroyed the town.And he [i.e. Salmoneus] acted profanely, by casting torches (in the air) as if they were lightnings,And dragging dried hides with kettles at his chariot,Pretending to make thunder, so he was thunderstruck by Zeus.Virgil's Aeneid has Salmoneus placed in Tartarus after Zeus smites him where he is subjected to eternal torment.

Inspiration
According to Frazer, the early Greek kings, who were expected to produce rain for the benefit of the crops, were in the habit of imitating thunder and lightning in the character of Zeus. At Crannon in Thessaly, there was a bronze chariot which in time of drought was shaken and prayers offered for rain. S. Reinach suggests that the story that Salmoneus was struck by lightning was due to the misinterpretation of a picture, in which a Thessalian magician appeared bringing down lightning and rain from heaven. Hence arose the idea that he was the victim of the anger or jealousy of Zeus and that the picture represented his punishment.

See also
List of Hercules (1998 TV series) episodes, season 1, episode 2

Notes

References 

 Apollodorus, The Library with an English Translation by Sir James George Frazer, F.B.A., F.R.S. in 2 Volumes, Cambridge, MA, Harvard University Press; London, William Heinemann Ltd. 1921. ISBN 0-674-99135-4. Online version at the Perseus Digital Library. Greek text available from the same website.
Diodorus Siculus, The Library of History translated by Charles Henry Oldfather. Twelve volumes. Loeb Classical Library. Cambridge, Massachusetts: Harvard University Press; London: William Heinemann, Ltd. 1989. Vol. 3. Books 4.59–8. Online version at Bill Thayer's Web Site
 Diodorus Siculus, Bibliotheca Historica. Vol 1-2. Immanel Bekker. Ludwig Dindorf. Friedrich Vogel. in aedibus B. G. Teubneri. Leipzig. 1888–1890. Greek text available at the Perseus Digital Library.
 Hesiod, Catalogue of Women from Homeric Hymns, Epic Cycle, Homerica translated by Evelyn-White, H G. Loeb Classical Library Volume 57. London: William Heinemann, 1914. Online version at theio.com
 Hyginus, Fabulae from The Myths of Hyginus translated and edited by Mary Grant. University of Kansas Publications in Humanistic Studies. Online version at the Topos Text Project.
 Strabo, The Geography of Strabo. Edition by H.L. Jones. Cambridge, Mass.: Harvard University Press; London: William Heinemann, Ltd. 1924. Online version at the Perseus Digital Library.
 Strabo, Geographica edited by A. Meineke. Leipzig: Teubner. 1877. Greek text available at the Perseus Digital Library.
 Publius Vergilius Maro, Aeneid. Theodore C. Williams. trans. Boston. Houghton Mifflin Co. 1910. Online version at the Perseus Digital Library.
 Publius Vergilius Maro, Bucolics, Aeneid, and Georgics. J. B. Greenough. Boston. Ginn & Co. 1900. Latin text available at the Perseus Digital Library.
Tzetzes, John, Book of Histories, Book VII-VIII translated by Vasiliki Dogani from the original Greek of T. Kiessling's edition of 1826. Online version at theio.com

Aeolides
Princes in Greek mythology
Kings of Elis
Kings in Greek mythology
Condemned souls in Tartarus
Characters in Book VI of the Aeneid
Thessalian characters in Greek mythology
Elean mythology
Thessalian mythology
Deeds of Zeus
Classical mythology in popular culture